Yun Chol (born 21 February 1966) is a North Korean weightlifter. He competed in the men's middle heavyweight event at the 1992 Summer Olympics. He also won a silver medal at the 1990 Asian Games and finished seventh at the 1990 World Weightlifting Championships.

References

External links
 
 
 Yun Chol, Olympic Lifters Profiles at Lift Up

1966 births
Living people
North Korean male weightlifters
Olympic weightlifters of North Korea
Weightlifters at the 1992 Summer Olympics
Place of birth missing (living people)
Asian Games medalists in weightlifting
Weightlifters at the 1990 Asian Games
Asian Games silver medalists for North Korea
Medalists at the 1990 Asian Games
21st-century North Korean people
20th-century North Korean people